Pony's Express is the debut album by saxophonist Pony Poindexter which was released on the Epic label in 1962.

Reception

Ken Dryden of Allmusic stated: "It's a shame that Pony Poindexter didn't get many more opportunities to record as a leader, as this release demonstrates his considerable promise".

Track listing 
 "Catin' Latin" (Pony Poindexter) - 4:15
 "Salt Peanuts" (Kenny Clarke, Dizzy Gillespie) - 3:39
 "Skylark" (Hoagy Carmichael, Johnny Mercer) - 3:44
 "Struttin' With Some Barbecue" (Lil Hardin Armstrong, Don Raye) - 5:32
 "Blue" (Gildo Mahones) - 5:31
 ""B" Frequency" (Teo Macero) - 1:43
 "Mickey Mouse March" (Jimmie Dodd) - 3:06
 "Basin Street Blues" (Spencer Williams) - 3:44
 "Pony's Express" (Poindexter) - 2:20
 "Lanyop" (Poindexter) - 9:40
 "Artistry in Rhythm" (Stan Kenton) - 2:15

Personnel 
Pony Poindexter - alto saxophone, soprano saxophone
Eric Dolphy (tracks 6 & 10), Gene Quill (tracks 1, 2, 4, 9 & 11), Sonny Red (tracks 3, 5-7, 8 & 10), Phil Woods (tracks 1-5, 7-9 & 11) - alto saxophone
Dexter Gordon (tracks 1, 2, 4, 9 & 11), Jimmy Heath (tracks 6 & 10), Clifford Jordan (tracks 3, 5-7, 8 & 10), Billy Mitchell (tracks 1, 2, 4, 9 & 11), Sal Nistico (tracks 3, 5, 7 & 8) - tenor saxophone 
Pepper Adams - baritone saxophone
Tommy Flanagan (tracks 3, 5-7, 8 & 10), Gildo Mahones (tracks 1, 2, 4 & 9-11) - piano 
Ron Carter (tracks 3, 5-7, 8 & 10), Bill Yancey (tracks 1, 2, 4, 9 & 11) - bass
Elvin Jones (tracks 6 & 10), Charli Persip  (tracks 1-5, 7-9 & 11)  - drums

References 

Pony Poindexter albums
1962 albums
Epic Records albums
Albums produced by Teo Macero